The 1896 United States presidential election in Ohio was held on November 3, 1896 as part of the 1896 United States presidential election. State voters chose 23 electors to the Electoral College, who voted for president and vice president.

Since the Civil War, Ohio politics had been controlled by a conflict between the anti-Civil War Appalachian southeast and German-American counties of the northwest, opposed both to the heavily Yankee and New Englander northeast and to the Ohio Company counties of the southeast. There was also an area of the Virginia Military District in the southwest that was historically the state’s Whig stronghold and later voted Republican. The GOP had consistently controlled the state during this era, if largely due to the prevalence of Ohio natives on the ticket, losing only one electoral vote to Democrat Grover Cleveland in 1892.

In 1896, the Democratic Party moved away from its urban northeastern Irish-American base to attempt to forge an alliance of the developing Jim Crow “Solid South” with the Populist West. The Midwest had seen the nation‘s worst labor strife in the years between the 1892 and 1896 elections, and the Republican Party saw Bryan as attempting to ferment class war. Although Ohio had been affected severely by the farm crisis of the early 1890s, its strong coverage by rail transport made this much less of a problem than it was in the more remote Plains States.

Consequently, Ohio was narrowly won by the Republican Party candidate and native son, William McKinley, with 51.86% of the popular vote. The Democratic Party candidate, William Jennings Bryan, garnered 47.08% of the popular vote.

Results

Results by county

See also
 United States presidential elections in Ohio

References

Ohio
1896
1896 Ohio elections